Makamba Province is the southernmost province of Burundi. The province has a population of 430,899 (2008 census) and covers an area of 1,960 km.  The provincial capital is Makamba. Makamba has six communes, many refugees have returned from Tanzania to this province, especially to the communes of Kayogoro, Nyanza lac, Mabanda and Vugizo. This causes a big problem, because there is not enough land for everybody. It is the most fertile province of Burundi.

Communes
It is divided administratively into the following communes:

 Commune of Kayogoro
 Commune of Kibago
 Commune of Mabanda
 Commune of Makamba
 Commune of Nyanza-Lac
 Commune of Vugizo

 
Provinces of Burundi